Gatot Mangkoepradja, also spelled Gatot Mangkupraja, (25 December 1898 - 4 October 1968) was an Indonesian national hero, activist and politician, who suggested the formation of the Defenders of the Homeland (PETA) militia during the Japanese occupation of the Dutch East Indies.

References

1898 births
1968 deaths
Indonesian collaborators with Imperial Japan
Indonesian politicians
Indonesian revolutionaries
Members of Pembela Tanah Air
National Heroes of Indonesia
People from Sumedang